The Central District of Behbahan County is a district (bakhsh) in Behbahan County, Khuzestan Province, Iran. At the 2012 census, its population was 230,774, in 40,588 families.  The District has two cities: Behbahan & Mansuriyeh. The District has two rural districts (dehestan): Dodangeh Rural District and Howmeh Rural District.

References 

Behbahan County
Districts of Khuzestan Province